Michael Gard (born 24 January 1952) is a former Australian politician. He was born in Franklin, Tasmania. He was an unsuccessful Labor candidate for Braddon in the 1996 Tasmanian election, but in 1997 he was elected in a countback following the resignation of Michael Field. He was defeated in 1998, when the House was reduced in size.

References

1952 births
Living people
Members of the Tasmanian House of Assembly
Australian Labor Party members of the Parliament of Tasmania